Cooperconcha is a genus of air-breathing land snails, terrestrial pulmonate gastropod mollusks in the family Camaenidae.

Species
Species within the genus Cooperconcha include:
 Cooperconcha centralis
 Cooperconcha bunyerooana
 Cooperconcha mawsoni

References

http://nomen.at/Cooperconcha

 
Camaenidae
Taxonomy articles created by Polbot